Haut may refer to:

 Haut (newspaper), a newspaper published in Luxembourg 
 Walter Haut (1922–2005), American airman who played a role in the Roswell UFO incident

See also

Haute (disambiguation)
Die Haut, a German band